Isabella Krassnitzer (born 22 July 1967 in Klagenfurt) is an Austrian journalist, radio and television presenter, best known for her reporting on ORF and Hitradio Ö3 since 1995.

References

1967 births
Living people
Austrian journalists
Austrian women journalists
Austrian television presenters
Austrian women television presenters
Austrian radio presenters
Austrian women radio presenters
Mass media people from Klagenfurt